The following is a list of wars involving Indonesia.

See also
 Foreign relations of Indonesia

References

List
Indonesia
Wars
Wars